Spring in the Air is a 1934 British comedy film directed by Victor Hanbury and Norman Lee and starring Edmund Gwenn, Zelma O'Neal and Theo Shall. It was made at Elstree Studios.

Cast
 Edmund Gwenn as Franz  
 Zelma O'Neal as Ila  
 Theo Shall as Paul  
 Lydia Sherwood as Vilma  
 Gus McNaughton as Max  
 Mary Jerrold as Albertina  
 Winifred Oughton as Minna  
 Jane Welsh as Rosa

References

Bibliography
 Low, Rachael. Filmmaking in 1930s Britain. George Allen & Unwin, 1985.
 Wood, Linda. British Films, 1927-1939. British Film Institute, 1986.

External links

1934 films
British comedy films
1934 comedy films
Films directed by Norman Lee
Films directed by Victor Hanbury
Films shot at British International Pictures Studios
British black-and-white films
Films scored by Jack Beaver
1930s English-language films
1930s British films